Melinaea menophilus, the Hewitson's tiger or Hewitson's tiger-wing, is a species of butterfly of the family Nymphalidae. It is found throughout the Amazonian region.

The wingspan is 70–80 mm.

Subspecies
Melinaea menophilus cocana Haensch, 1903 (Ecuador)
Melinaea menophilus ernestoi Brown, 1977 (Colombia)
Melinaea menophilus hicetas Godman & Salvin, 1879 (Colombia, Peru)
Melinaea menophilus maenius (Hewitson, 1860) (Brazil (Amazonas))
Melinaea menophilus mediatrix Weymer, 1891 (Guianas, northern Brazil)
Melinaea menophilus menophilus (Colombia)
Melinaea menophilus orestes Salvin, 1871 (Peru)
Melinaea menophilus zaneka Butler, 1870 (Ecuador)

References

Ithomiini
Fauna of Brazil
Nymphalidae of South America
Taxa named by William Chapman Hewitson
Butterflies described in 1856